Wishram may refer to:

 Wasco-Wishram, two Native American tribes from Oregon
 Wasco-Wishram language, a dialect of Upper Chinook, a Chinookan language
Wishram, Washington, a census-designated place in the U.S. state of Washington
Wishram village, formerly the largest village occupied by the Wishram tribe.